Lough Rea, also Loughrea Lake, is a lake in Ireland, located south of Loughrea, County Galway.

Wildlife
Lough Rea is stocked with three-spined stickleback, ninespine stickleback, eel, perch, brown trout, rudd and pike.

In folklore
In the tradition of other Dindsenchas myths, according to Irish tradition, Lough Rea was formed after a battle fought between pre-Christian deities, who took the form of deer. The force of their battle causing a well to burst and the lake to form.

Another popular piece of folklore says that there was once a town where the lake is today, but the town was submerged underneath the water.

See also 
 List of loughs in Ireland

References 

Rea